Muraena melanotis is a moray eel found in the eastern and western Atlantic Ocean. It is commonly known as the honeycomb moray. It grows to am maximum length of about 1 metre.

Distribution
In the eastern Atlantic Ocean, this fish occurs along the coast of Africa from Mauritania to Namibia, including Cape Verde and the islands in the Gulf of Guinea. In the western Atlantic, this fish occurs in the Caribbean.

References

melanotis
Fish described in 1860
Fish of West Africa
Fish of the Dominican Republic